

Gorrie Airfield was a Royal Australian Air Force (RAAF) airfield in the Northern Territory of Australia during World War II located about  north of Larrimah and about  south of Mataranka in what is now the locality of Elsey.

The airfield was named after Flying Officer Peter Gorrie who was killed in action on 12 January 1942 during an attack against enemy shipping at Menado.

The establishment at Gorrie comprised over 6,000 RAAF personnel responsible for aircraft and vehicle maintenance for the RAAF and United States Army Air Forces. A large petrol storage and bomb dump were constructed as part of the airfield. The remains of the runway and many of the buildings and structures are still visible.

Units based at Gorrie Airfield
 No. 9 Stores Depot (RAAF)
 No. 14 Aircraft Repair Depot (RAAF)
 No. 18 Replenishing Centre (RAAF)
 No. 55 Operational Base Unit (RAAF)

See also
 List of airports in the Northern Territory

References

External links
Historic Sites - Attractions
OzatWar website

Former Royal Australian Air Force bases
World War II airfields in Australia
Defunct airports in the Northern Territory
Northern Territory Heritage Register